Transtillaspis crepera is a species of moth of the family Tortricidae. It is found in Napo Province, Ecuador.

The wingspan is 16 mm. The ground colour of the forewings is pale brownish, with a weak ochreous admixture and brown strigulation (fine streaks). The hindwings are ochreous cream, but cream towards the base. The strigulation is pale brownish.

Etymology
The species name refers to the colouration of forewings and is derived from Latin crepera (meaning dark).

References

Moths described in 2005
Transtillaspis
Moths of South America
Taxa named by Józef Razowski